Pierre Grimal (November 21, 1912, in Paris – November 2, 1996, in Paris) was a French historian, classicist and Latinist.  Fascinated by the Greek and Roman civilizations, he did much to promote the cultural inheritance of the classical world, both among specialists and the general public.

Biography 
Admitted to the École Normale Supérieure in 1933, and received third at the "agrégation de lettres" in 1935, he was member of the École française de Rome (1935–1937) then taught Latin at a Rennes lycée.  Then he was active as a professor of Roman civilization at the faculties of Caen and Bordeaux, and finally at the Sorbonne for thirty years.

He published studies on the Roman civilization, of which many volumes to the "Que sais-je?" series, and translations of Latin classical authors (Cicero, Seneca the Younger, Tacitus, Plautus, Terence).  On his retirement, he also published biographies and fictionalized histories (Mémoires d’Agrippine, le procès Néron), more intended for the general public.

At the end of his life, he campaigned for the safeguarding of literary teaching.

Works 
All published in Paris:
 Dictionnaire de la mythologie grecque et romaine, published by PUF, 1951, fifth edition  in 1976
 Romans grecs et latins, Bibliothèque de la Pléiade, 1958
 Le siècle des Scipions, Rome et l’Hellénisme au temps des guerres puniques, Aubier, second edition in 1975
 La littérature latine, PUF Que sais-je? n° 376, 1965
 La mythologie grecque, PUF Que sais-je? n° 582, ninth edition in 1978
 L’art des jardins, PUF Que sais-je? n° 618, third edition  1974
 Les villes romaines, PUF Que sais-je? n° 657, first edition 1954, seventh edition in 1990
 Le siècle d’Auguste, PUF Que sais-je? n° 676, 1965
 Dans les pas des césars, Hachette, 1955
 Horace, Editions du Seuil, 1955
 La civilisation romaine, Arthaud, fourth edition in 1970
 Italie retrouvée, PUF, 1979
 Nous partons pour Rome, PUF, third edition   1977
 L’amour à Rome, Belles Lettres, 1979
 Mythologies, Larousse, 1964
 Histoire mondiale de la femme, Nouvelle Librairie de France, 1965
 Etude de chronologie cicéronienne, Les Belles Lettres, 1977
 Essai sur l’art poétique d’Horace, Paris SEDES, 1968
 Le guide de l’étudiant latiniste, PUF, 1971
 La guerre civile de Petrone, dans ses rapports avec la Pharsale, Les Belles Lettres, 1977
 Le Lyrisme à Rome, PUF, 1978
 Sénèque, ou la conscience de l’Empire, Les Belles Lettres, 1978
 Le théâtre antique, PUF Que sais-je number 1732, 1978
 Le Quercy de Pierre Grimal, Arthaud, 1978
 Sénèque, PUF Que sais-je number 1950, 1981
 Jérôme Carcopino, un historien au service de l’humanisme (in collaboration with  Cl. Carcopino and P. Oubliac), Les Belles Lettres, 1981
 Rome, les siècles et les jours, Arthaud, 1982
 Virgile ou la seconde naissance de Rome, Arthaud, 1985
 Rome, la littérature et l'histoire, École française de Rome, 1986
 Cicéron, Fayard, 1986
 Les erreurs de la liberté, Les Belles Lettres, 1989
 Tacite, Fayard, 1990
 Marc Aurèle
 Les mémoires d’Agrippine, editions De Fallois, 1992
 Le procès de Néron, editions De Fallois

Translations

Latin to French
 Frontinus, De aquae ductu Urbis Romae, Belles Lettres, 1944
 Petronius, Satyricon, in Romans grecs et latins, Bibliothèque de la Pléiade, 1958
 Apuleius, Les Métamorphoses, in Romans grecs et latins, Bibliothèque de la Pléiade, 1958
 Longus, La pastorale de Daphnis et Chloé, in Romans grecs et latins, Bibliothèque de la Pléiade, 1958
 Petronius, Satyricon, Livre de poche, 1960
 Seneca the Younger
 De brevitate vitae, PUF, 1959
 Phaedra, PUF, 1965
 De vita beata, PUF, 1969
 Apuleius, Amor and Psyche, PUF, 1963
 Plautus and Terence, complete works, Paris NFR, 1971
 Tacitus, complete works, La Pléiade, 1990
 Cicero (published posthumously)
 In Pisonem, Belles Lettres, 1967
 Pro Plancio, Belles Lettres, 1976
 The memoirs of Pomponius Atticus, Belles Lettres, 1976

Greek to French
 Chariton, Les aventures de Chéréas et de Callirhoé, in Romans grecs et latins, Bibliothèque de la Pléiade, 1958
 Heliodorus of Emesa, Les Ethiopiques, in Romans grecs et latins, Bibliothèque de la Pléiade, 1958
 Achilles Tatius, Le roman de Leucippé et Clitophon, in Romans grecs et latins, Bibliothèque de la Pléiade, 1958
 Philostratos, Vie d'Apollonios de Tyane, in Romans grecs et latins, Bibliothèque de la Pléiade, 1958
 Lucian, Histoire véritable, in Romans grecs et latins, Bibliothèque de la Pléiade, 1958
 Lucian, La Confession de Cyprien, in Romans grecs et latins, Bibliothèque de la Pléiade, 1958

Honours
Pierre Grimal was a member of:
 l' Académie des inscriptions et belles lettres, from 1978
 Comité d'honneur de l'ASSELAF (Association pour la sauvegarde et l'expansion de la langue française)

References

Writers from Paris
1912 births
1996 deaths
French classical scholars
Greek–French translators
Latin–French translators
Historians of antiquity
French Latinists
École Normale Supérieure alumni
French scholars of Roman history
Members of the Académie des Inscriptions et Belles-Lettres
Winners of the Prix Broquette-Gonin (literature)
20th-century French translators
French male non-fiction writers
Commandeurs of the Ordre des Arts et des Lettres
20th-century French male writers
Members of the Royal Swedish Academy of Sciences